Michal Fikrt (born April 6, 1982 in Most, Czechoslovakia) is a Czech professional ice hockey player. He plays goaltender for TH Unia Oświęcim in the Polska Liga Hokejowa.

Clubs
Fikrt started out playing regularly for the juniors of HC Litvínov, later appearing regularly for HC Slovan Ústí nad Labem and SK Kadaň in the Czech First League (second division in the country). He had regular top-level experience in the Slovak Extraliga with HK Dynamax Nitra (now HK Ardo Nitra). Fikrt also made a few games for other clubs, usually as the cover.

Country
He, along with teammate Martin Barek, were the goalies for the Czech Republic junior team in a 2000 5-nations tournament against their Swedish, Slovakian, Russian and Finnish counterparts. In this tournament Fikrt was voted goalie of the tournament, and the Czech team finished third, conceding 13 goals.

Fikrt also was with the junior team for 2002 World Junior Ice Hockey Championships, when Czech team was in third position.

References

External links

 
 Michal Fikrt on the official HC Liberec website
 Michal Fikrt's career stats at eliteprospects.com

1982 births
Czech ice hockey goaltenders
HC Benátky nad Jizerou players
HC Bílí Tygři Liberec players
Sportovní Klub Kadaň players
HK Levice players
MHk 32 Liptovský Mikuláš players
HC Litvínov players
Living people
HK Acroni Jesenice players
Metallurg Zhlobin players
HK Nitra players
Piráti Chomutov players
HC Slovan Ústečtí Lvi players
TH Unia Oświęcim players
HC Vlci Jablonec nad Nisou players
Sportspeople from Most (city)
Czech expatriate ice hockey players in Slovakia
Czech expatriate sportspeople in Poland
Czech expatriate sportspeople in Belarus
Expatriate ice hockey players in Poland
Expatriate ice hockey players in Belarus